Hindsboro is a village in Douglas County, Illinois, United States. The population was 275 at the 2020 census.

Geography

The Illinois Midland Railroad line, connecting Terre Haute and Peoria, and passing through Paris and Decatur, opened on November 30, 1874. It ran just north of the grain elevator.

Demographics
As of the 2020 census there were 275 people, 160 households, and 118 families residing in the village. The racial makeup of the village was 95.64% White, 1.45% from other races, and 2.91% from two or more races. Hispanic or Latino of any race were 6.18% of the population.

There were 160 households, out of which 40.63% had children under the age of 18 living with them, 56.25% were married couples living together, 8.13% had a female householder with no husband present, and 26.25% were non-families. 24.38% of all households were made up of individuals, and 14.38% had someone living alone who was 65 years of age or older. The average household size was 2.84 and the average family size was 2.50.

The village's age distribution consisted of 19.8% under the age of 18, 7.5% from 18 to 24, 24.4% from 25 to 44, 28.9% from 45 to 64, and 19.8% who were 65 years of age or older. The median age was 43.0 years. For every 100 females, there were 72.4 males. For every 100 females age 18 and over, there were 79.3 males.

The median income for a household in the village was $58,750, and the median income for a family was $63,125. Males had a median income of $40,673 versus $26,442 for females. The per capita income for the village was $27,193. About 3.4% of families and 4.5% of the population were below the poverty line, including 0.0% of those under age 18 and 3.8% of those age 65 or over.

Media
Hindsboro is served by a weekly paper, the Oakland Independent.

Notable person

 Dick Hyde, pitcher with the Washington Senators and Baltimore Orioles

References

Villages in Douglas County, Illinois
Villages in Illinois